Juana Saltitopa (c. 1815- c. 1860), also known as "La Coronela" (The Female Colonel) was an activist and member of the Dominican military. She played an important role in the Dominican War of Independence, specifically in the Battle on 30 March 1844 in Santiago de los Caballeros. Her exact birthdate is unknown as is her death.

Having liberal and independent character, Juana decided to participate in the conflicts for the independence of the Dominican Republic. She worked as a "water girl" transporting water for the needs of the Dominican troops and to refresh the cannons. She also took on the duties of a nurse, attending the Dominican combatants. Her attitude and valor won her the name "La Coronela" (The Female Colonel).

According to Esteban Aybar, a soldier in the war and restructuring of Independence of the Dominican Republic, Juana was seen in Santo Domingo in 1852 earning pay as a Colonel working for the government. Later, President Pedro Santana, already in power, fired her and sent her back to Cibao.

Origin of her name 
Juana Saltitopa was born in the town Jamo near the province La Vega. Unlike her sister, Mercedes, Juana was a very extroverted and energized woman that liked to climb trees and jump branch to branch. That earned her the nickname "Saltitopa". She was known as a person that was rude with her gestures and actions.

Death 
Around the year 1860 Juana was assassinated on the way to Santiago, between Nibaje and Marilópez.

References 

Dominican Republic military personnel
Dominican Republic revolutionaries
People of the Dominican War of Independence
Women in the Dominican War of Independence
Women in war in the Caribbean
Women in 19th-century warfare